Robert E. Brown was a member of the Ohio House of Representatives from Perrysburg, serving from 1978-1985. Before his election he was executive director of the Zucker Center for the mentally handicapped and afterwards he became director of the Ohio department of mental retardation and developmental disabilities. 
Died on May 15, 2001.

References

1928 births
2001 deaths
Republican Party members of the Ohio House of Representatives
People from Perrysburg, Ohio
20th-century American politicians